Maanavan Ninaithal is a 2008 Indian Tamil language romantic drama film directed by S. P. Gnanamozhi. The film stars newcomer Rithik and Varshini, with K. Bhagyaraj, Manivannan, Manobala, Pandu, Anu Mohan, Nalini and Vaman Malini playing supporting roles. The film, produced by P. K. Chandran, was released on 18 July 2008.

Plot
In a village near Tiruvannamalai, the gifted student Sakthi is from a poor family and his widow mother Lakshmi runs a roadside food stall. Sakthi secures the state rank in plus two exam and he wishes to continue his studies but his family conditions and poverty compel him to give up his dream. During a television interview, Sakthi tells about his dream and the government then helps financially Sakthi to pursue his studies. Sakthi joins a prominent college in Chennai and he stays in a lodge with his new collegemate Kottachi.

Sakthi gets acquainted with a group of three bad students in the college and he starts taking drugs and drinking liquor. In the meantime, Sakthi befriends his collegemate Nivetha and falls in love with her. When Nivetha discovers that Sakthi loves her, she rejects him stating the difference in their status. One day, the bad students take advantage of Sakthi and they even steal his money, therefore, he cannot pay the college fees. Failing in life and in love, Sakthi decides to hang himself in a remote forest but before, he conveys his decision through an audio cassette and sends it to his mother by parcel. At that point, the press reporter Raj comes across him and saves him from ending his life. Raj, who is a skilled strategist and manipulator, even promises him to solve all his problems.

Raj first blackmails Nivetha to disclose about her love affair with Sakthi to her family and asks her money to buy his silence. With that money, he could pay the college fees of Sakthi. Raj then intercepts the audio cassette with the help of the police. Meanwhile, Nivetha accepts Sakthi's love. Later, Sakthi saves the three bad students who had stolen his money from being expelled from the college and they apologize for their mistakes. Sakthi passes the exam and he eventually marries Nivetha.

Cast

Rithik as Sakthi
Varshini as Nivetha
K. Bhagyaraj as Raj
Manivannan as Bhai
Manobala as Professor
Pandu as Professor
Anu Mohan as Mohan
Nalini as Nivetha's mother
Vaman Malini as Lakshmi, Sakthi's mother
Singamuthu as Bus conductor
Nellai Siva as Courier office manager
Kottachi as Kottachi 
Kili Ramachandran as Kili
Mumtaj Pakoda Kadhar
Chinrasu as Pickpocket
V. P. Pratheesh
Sivanarayanamoorthy as Inspector Sivanarayanamoorthy 
Suruli Manohar as Police constable
Round Lingan
Baladhasan
Selvakumar as Sivaraj
Sampathkumar as Sampath
Kalivaradan as Varadan
Sriram as Sriram
Tiruppur Thenali as Thenali
Bharathi in a special appearance
Risha in a special appearance

Production
S. P. Gnanamozhi made his directorial debut with Maanavan Ninaithal under the banner of Arul Movies. Rithik was cast to play the hero while Varshini who was last seen in Achacho (2007) signed to play the heroine under the name of Adhira. V. Thashi who won the Kerala State Film Award for Best Background Music in 2006 composed the music for this film.

Soundtrack

The film score and the soundtrack were composed by V. Thashi. The soundtrack features 6 tracks.

Reception
S. R. Ashok Kumar of The Hindu said, "K. Bhagyaraj still has the magic but he should concentrate more on his make-up and the way he is shown in the film. Both Rithik and Athira are clueless as to what they need to do in some of the scenes" and added, "Both the story and the screenplay are nothing new and the dialogue is average". A reviewer rated the film 2.75 out of 5 and said, "The idea of bringing about the brighter side and the harsh realities of life was really good but then the makers should have focused on giving the characters more depth and intensity. While the first half of the film goes about on a surface, the second half has its impact moments and intense emotions but then the flavour could have been more tasteful". Indiaglitz said, "'Maanavan Ninaithal' is a movie that could have been made better had the director infused pace in the screenplay. The narration too could have been placed in better order. Taking into considering that this is Gnanamozhi's maiden venture, a pass mark can be given". Another reviewer stated, "the film looks good and appreciable at some points and it would have been nice if director had focused more on gripping screenplay".

References

2008 films
2000s Tamil-language films
Indian romantic drama films
2008 directorial debut films
2008 romantic drama films